Joseph Torbey (Arabic: جوزيف طربيه, from Tannourine) is a Lebanese banker, the Chairman of the Crédit Libanais bank and the head of the World Union of Arab Bankers (WUAB).

Biography 
Born in Beirut, Joseph Torbey holds a PhD in Law from the University of Lyon in France, and studied Public administration and Business Taxation at the University of Southern California, Los Angeles.

He was head of the Income Tax Department at the Ministry of Finance from 1970 to 1988. In 1988, he became the Chairman of Crédit Libanais. He was the president of the Association of Banks in Lebanon (ABL) from 2001 to 2005, 2009-2013 and 2015–2019.

In 2006, he became the head of the World Union of Arab Bankers (WUAB). He is also president of the Maronite League from 2007 to 2013.

See also 

 Salim Sfeir
 Antoun Sehnaoui
 Naïm Abou-Jaoudé
 Ayoub-Farid Michel Saab

External links 
 www.josephmtorbey.com

References 

Lebanese bankers
Year of birth missing (living people)
Living people
People from Beirut